Immanuel Danish Evangelical Lutheran Church is a historic church on W. Second Street in Kimballton, in Audubon County, Iowa.  It was built in 1904 and was added to the National Register in 1991.  Four years later it was included as a contributing property in the Kimballton West 2nd – West 3rd Street Residential District.

History
Located on a hill overlooking the east side of Kimballton, it is among the best-preserved historic Danish churches in Audubon and adjacent Shelby counties.  It was deemed significant "for its association with the Grundtvigian synod of the Danish Lutheran Church following the historic split within the church in 1894 and for its influence upon the growth and development of the Danish community of Kimballton. Furthermore, this property is the best representation of that historic synod in the Kimballton community and the two county area."  In the worldwide split of the Danish church, this is the main local church that followed the teachings of Bishop N. F. S. Grundtvig and is the only surviving "Grundtvigian" one.

A Christ-like statue on the altar is a copy of the one in Vor Frue Kirke in Copenhagen, Denmark, sculpted by the Danish sculptor Bertel Thorvaldsen.

The church was designed and built by two craftsmen from West Denmark, Wisconsin, Niels Hansen and Jens Rasmussen, who had built a Grundtvigian church there (which burned in the 1930s, though historic photographs survive).  They were brought to Kimballton by the pastor Jens Gregersen, who had come from West Denmark.  Hansen drew plans for the church similar to the design of the West Denmark church, and Rasmussen created interior features such as the pulpit, the altar, and the communion railing.

The 1898-built Bethany Danish Evangelical Lutheran Church, a mile or two away from Kimballton, also NRHP-listed, is a church that was on the other side of the split.

References

Danish-American culture in Iowa
Lutheran churches in Iowa
Churches on the National Register of Historic Places in Iowa
Gothic Revival church buildings in Iowa
Queen Anne architecture in Iowa
Churches completed in 1904
Kimballton, Iowa
Buildings and structures in Audubon County, Iowa
National Register of Historic Places in Audubon County, Iowa
Individually listed contributing properties to historic districts on the National Register in Iowa